Phyllonorycter cerasinella is a moth of the family Gracillariidae. It is found from all of Germany to the Iberian Peninsula, the Alps and Albania and from France to Ukraine and Bulgaria.

The larvae feed on Chamaespartium sagittale. They mine the leaves of their host plant. They create a very long, strongly folded and inflated, tentiform mine in the broad wings along the stem.

References

cerasinella
Moths of Europe
Moths described in 1852